Puberty blockers, also called puberty inhibitors or hormone blockers, are medicines used to postpone puberty in children. The most commonly used puberty blockers are gonadotropin-releasing hormone (GnRH) agonists, which suppress the production of sex hormones, including testosterone and estrogen. In addition to their use in treating precocious puberty (and sometimes idiopathic short stature) in children, puberty blockers are also used for transgender children to delay the development of unwanted sex characteristics, so as to allow transgender youth more time to explore their gender identity.

The use of puberty blockers in transgender youth is supported by twelve major American medical associations, including the American Medical Association, the American Psychological Association, the American Academy of Pediatrics, and the Endocrine Society four Australian medical associations, the British Medical Association, and the World Professional Association for Transgender Health (WPATH). In Europe some medical groups and countries have discouraged or limited the use of puberty blockers, including Sweden's National Board of Health and Welfare, British National Health Service and Finland.

Medical uses

Delaying or temporarily suspending puberty is a medical treatment for children whose puberty started abnormally early (precocious puberty). Puberty blockers have been used on-label since the 1980s to treat precocious puberty in children, and were approved for use in treating precocious puberty in children by the U.S. Food and Drug Administration (FDA) in 1993. Puberty blockers are also commonly used for children with idiopathic short stature, for whom these medications can be used to promote development of long bones and increase adult height. In adults, the same drugs have a range of different medical uses, including the treatment of endometriosis, breast and prostate cancer, and polycystic ovary syndrome. 

Puberty blockers prevent the development of biological secondary sex characteristics. They slow the growth of sexual organs and production of hormones. Other effects include the suppression of male features of facial hair, deep voices, and Adam's apples, and the halting of female features of breast development and menstruation.

Gender-affirming care
Puberty blockers are sometimes prescribed to young transgender people, to temporarily halt the development of secondary sex characteristics. Puberty blockers allow patients more time to solidify their gender identity, without developing secondary sex characteristics, and give transgender youth a smoother transition into their desired gender identity as an adult. If a child later decides not to transition to another gender the medication can be stopped, allowing puberty to proceed. Little is known about the long-term side effects of hormone or puberty blockers in children with gender dysphoria. Although puberty blockers are known to be safe and physically reversible treatment if stopped in the short term, it is also not known whether hormone blockers affect the development of factors like bone mineral density, brain development and fertility in transgender patients. 

Puberty blockers have not received FDA approval for use on children who are transgender. The practice of off-label prescription is common in children's medicine, and does not indicate an improper, illegal, or experimental use of medicine. According to Dr Brad Miller, pharmaceutical companies that make puberty blocker drugs for children with gender dysphoria have refused to submit them for FDA approval because doing so would cost too much money and "because (transgender treatment) was a political hot potato."

While few studies have examined the effects of puberty blockers for gender non-conforming or transgender adolescents, the studies that have been conducted generally indicate that these treatments are reasonably safe, are reversible, and can improve psychological well-being in these individuals.

A 2020 review published in Child and Adolescent Mental Health found that puberty blockers are associated with such positive outcomes as decreased suicidality in adulthood, improved affect and psychological functioning, and improved social life. A 2020 survey published in Pediatrics found that puberty blockers are associated with better mental health outcomes and lower odds of lifetime suicidal ideation. 2022 study published in the Journal of the American Medical Association found a 60% reduction in moderate and severe depression and a 73% reduction in suicidality among transgender youth aged 13–20 who took puberty blockers and gender-affirming hormones over a 12-month follow-up. A 2022 study published in The Lancet involving 720 transgender adolescents who took puberty blockers and hormones found that 98 percent continued to use hormones at a follow up appointment.

A 2020 commissioned review published by the National Institute for Health and Care Excellence concluded that the quality of evidence for puberty blocker outcomes (for mental health, quality of life and impact on gender dysphoria) was of very low certainty based on the GRADE scale. The Finnish government commissioned a review of the research evidence for treatment of transgender minors and the Finnish Ministry of Health concluded that there are no research-based health care methods for minors with gender dysphoria. Nevertheless, they recommend the use of puberty blockers for minors on a case-by-case basis.

The World Professional Association for Transgender Health's Standards of Care 8, published in 2022, declare puberty blocking medication as "medically necessary", and recommends them for usage in transgender adolescents once the patient has reached Tanner stage 2 of development, and state that longitudinal data shows improved outcomes for transgender patients who receive them.

The longest follow-up study followed a transgender man who began taking puberty blockers at age 13 in 1988, before later taking hormone treatments, and later got gender confirmation surgery as an adult. His health was monitored for 22 years and at age 35 in 2010 was well-functioning, in good physical health with normal metabolic, endocrine, and bone mineral density levels. There were no clinical signs of a negative impact on brain development from taking puberty blockers.

Adverse effects

Short-term side effects of puberty blockers include headaches, fatigue, insomnia, muscle aches and changes in breast tissue, mood, and weight. 

Adverse effects on bone mineralization and compromised fertility are potential risks of pubertal suppression in gender dysphoric youth treated with GnRH agonists. To protect against lower bone density, doctors recommend exercise, calcium, and Vitamin D. Additionally, genital tissue in transgender women may not be optimal for potential vaginoplasty later in life due to underdevelopment of the penis.

Research on the long-term effects on brain development, cognitive function, fertility, and sexual function is limited. A 2020 study conducted by Dr John Strang and other researchers suggested that "pubertal suppression may prevent key aspects of development during a sensitive period of brain organization", adding that "we need high-quality research to understand the impacts of this treatment – impacts which may be positive in some ways and potentially negative in others."

In 2016, the FDA ordered drugmakers to add warning labels to puberty blocker drugs being used to treat children with precocious puberty stating: "Psychiatric events have been reported in patients", including symptoms "such as crying, irritability, impatience, anger and aggression." The warning labels were added after the FDA received reports of 10 children who had suicidal thoughts, including one attempt at suicide. One of these children, a 14-year-old, was taking a puberty blocker drug for gender dysphoria.

In 2022, the FDA reported that there have been six cases of idiopathic intracranial hypertension in 5 to 12-year-old children assigned female at birth taking puberty blockers. Five who experienced the side effect were receiving treatment for precocious puberty and one who experienced the side effect was transgender and was receiving treatment for gender dysphoria. Dr. Morissa Ladinsky, a pediatrician with University of Alabama-Birmingham who works with transgender youth, said that "[Idiopathic intracranial hypertension] is an inordinately well-known side effect that can happen for many, many different medications, most commonly, oral birth control pills." Referring to the six reported side effects, Ladinsky said that "It doesn't even approach any semblance of what we call in medicine, statistical significance".

Available forms
A number of different puberty blockers are used. These include the GnRH agonists buserelin, histrelin, leuprorelin, nafarelin, and triptorelin. GnRH agonists are available and used as daily subcutaneous injections, depot subcutaneous or intramuscular injections lasting 1 to 6 months, implants lasting 12 months, and nasal sprays used multiple times per day. GnRH antagonists are also expected to be effective as puberty blockers but have not yet been widely studied or used for this purpose. Progestogens used at high doses such as medroxyprogesterone acetate and cyproterone acetate have been used as puberty blockers in the past or when GnRH agonists are not possible. They are not as effective as GnRH agonists and have more side effects. The antiandrogen bicalutamide has been used as an alternative puberty blocker in transgender girls for whom GnRH agonists were denied by insurance.

Centrally acting puberty blockers such as GnRH agonists are ineffective in peripheral precocious puberty, which is gonadotropin-independent. In this situation, direct inhibitors of sex hormone action and/or synthesis must be employed instead. Treatment options for peripheral precocious puberty in girls, such as in McCune–Albright syndrome, include ketoconazole, the aromatase inhibitors testolactone, fadrozole, anastrozole, and letrozole, and the antiestrogens tamoxifen and fulvestrant. Treatment possibilities for peripheral precocious puberty in boys, such as in familial male-limited precocious puberty, include the antiandrogens bicalutamide, spironolactone, and cyproterone acetate, ketoconazole, and the aromatase inhibitors testolactone, anastrozole, and letrozole.

In the United States, the main providers of puberty blockers are Endo International and AbbVie.

Legal and political challenges 
There is criticism regarding issues of informed consent and limited research support for the use of puberty blockers on transgender children. Michael Biggs has said that studies on the effects of puberty blockers on transgender children lack transparency or validity. The Endocrine Society Guidelines call for more rigorous safety and effectiveness evaluations and careful assessment of "the effects of prolonged delay of puberty in adolescents on bone health, gonadal function, and the brain (including effects on cognitive, emotional, social, and sexual development)."

Social conservatives have argued that gender-affirming care, including puberty blockers, constitutes child abuse and medical experimentation. In response to this argument, a 2021 editorial in The Lancet Child & Adolescent Health stated that "This stance wilfully ignores decades of use of and research about puberty blockers and hormone therapy".

Some opponents of the use of puberty blockers argue that minors are not able to give proper consent. Some advocates for the use of puberty blockers argue that there are psychological and developmental benefits of puberty blockers which are compelling enough to overlook the issue of informed consent in many cases. According to a 2019 study, a "multidisciplinary staged approach" is necessary "to ensure meaningful consent". According to the 2021 editorial, "Disproportionate emphasis is given to young people's inability to provide medical consent, a moot point given that—like any medical care—parental consent is required. ... what matters ethically is whether an individual has a good enough reason for wanting treatment". Bioethicist Maura Priest contends that, even in the absence of parental permission, the use of puberty blockers could mitigate any adverse effects on familial relationships within the home of a transgender child. She posits that there are benefits to having access to puberty blockers, while psychological costs are often associated with untreated gender dysphoria in children. Bioethicist Florence Ashley contends that counseling and educating the parents of transgender youth could also be beneficial to familial relationships.

One study found that the use of puberty blockers decreases the risk of depression and reduces behavioral issues. Opponents have argued that potentially negative "effects may be too subtle to observe during the follow-up sessions by clinical assessment alone".

Opponents of the use of puberty blockers in adolescents argue that gender identity is still fluctuating at this age and that blockers might interfere with gender identity formation and development of a free sexuality, as well as pointing to what they consider to be high rates of desistance after puberty. Almost all (98%) children who took puberty blockers in a significant recent study by the main UK child/adolescent gender clinic continued on to hormone replacement therapy. Similarly, most reviews noting psychological benefits refer to the classic Dutch study, which had very stringent requirements for medical treatment.

In 2022, Texas Attorney General Ken Paxton and the Texas Department of Family and Protective Services opened investigations into parents giving gender affirming healthcare including puberty blockers to children. Such investigations could separate transgender children from their parents. In response, Dr. Melissa Merrick, President and CEO of Prevent Child Abuse America wrote "AG Paxton's statement stands in direct opposition to the evidence-based care recognized by numerous professional societies, including the American Academy of Pediatrics, American Medical Association, Endocrine Society, and American Academy of Child and Adolescent Psychiatry."

In April 2021, Arkansas passed a ban on treatment of minors under 18 with puberty blockers, but it was temporarily blocked by a federal judge a week before the law was set to take effect. In April 2022, Alabama passed a ban from minors under 19 from obtaining puberty blockers and made it a felony for a doctor to prescribe puberty blockers to a minor with a punishment of up to ten years in prison. The Alabama law was partially blocked by a federal judge a few days after the law took effect. In August 2022, Florida banned Medicaid from covering gender affirming care, including puberty blockers. State bans on gender affirming care including puberty blockers have led some families with transgender children to flee their states.

Stances of medical organizations 
Efforts to ban puberty blockers are opposed by the American Medical Association, the American Academy of Child and Adolescent Psychiatry (AACAP), the American Academy of Pediatrics, the American Psychiatric Association, the Endocrine Society, the Pediatric Endocrine Society, the American College of Obstetricians and Gynecologists, the American Psychological Association, the American College of Physicians, the American Academy of Family Physicians, the American Osteopathic Association, the American Association of Clinical Endocrinologists, the American Nurses Association, the US Professional Association for Transgender Health, and the World Professional Association for Transgender Health (WPATH). In Australia, the Royal Australasian College of Physicians, the Royal Australian College of General Practitioners, the Australian Endocrine Society, and AusPATH also all support access. In the UK, the British Medical Association supports access.

In Europe, some medical groups have discouraged or limited the use of puberty blockers. Following the Bell v Tavistock decision by the High Court of Justice for England and Wales, in which the High Court ruled children under 16 were not competent to give informed consent to puberty blockers — overturned by the Court of Appeal in September 2021 — Sweden's Karolinska Institute, administrator of the second-largest hospital system in the country, announced in March 2021 that it would discontinue providing puberty blockers or cross-sex hormones to children under 16. Additionally, the Karolinska Institute changed its policy to cease providing puberty blockers or cross-sex hormones to teenagers 16–18, outside of approved clinical trials. On 22 February 2022, Sweden's National Board of Health and Welfare said that puberty blockers should only be used in "exceptional cases" and said that their use is backed by "uncertain science". However, other providers in Sweden continue to provide puberty blockers and in Sweden, a clinician's professional judgment determines what treatments are recommended or not recommended. Youth are able to access gender-affirming care when doctors deem it medically necessary. The treatment is not banned in Sweden, unlike in Alabama and Arkansas, and is offered as part of its national healthcare service.

On 30 June 2020, the British National Health Service changed the information it displayed on its website regarding the reversibility of the effects of puberty blockers and their use in the treatment of minors with gender dysphoria, according to a report by BBC's Woman's Hour. Specifically, the NHS removed "the effects of treatment with GnRH analogues are considered to be fully reversible, so treatment can usually be stopped at any time after a discussion between you, your child and your MDT (multi-disciplinary team)," and added "little is known about the long-term side effects of hormone or puberty blockers in children with gender dysphoria. Although the Gender Identity Development Service (GIDS) advises this is a physically reversible treatment if stopped, it is not known what the psychological effects may be. It's also not known whether hormone blockers affect the development of the teenage brain or children's bones. Side effects may also include hot flushes, fatigue and mood alterations."

Public opinion 
A February 2022 poll by LGBT support service The Trevor Project and Morning Consult found that 52 percent of American adults expressed some level of support for transgender minors having access to puberty blockers if it is recommended by their doctor and supported by their parents.

An April 2021 PBS Newshour/NPR/Marist poll with the question "Do you support or oppose legislation that would prohibit gender transition-related medical care for minors" found 66% of Americans would oppose a ban, including 69% of Democrats, 70% of Republicans, and 64% of Independents.

References

External links 
 Puberty Inhibitors, by Dr Norman P. Spack, TransYouth Family Allies

Gender transitioning and medicine
Puberty